Acoustic Guitars is a Danish musical quintet influenced by Spanish, Arab and Indian music. It was formed by Mikkel Nordsø, Christian Ratzer, and Steen Kyed. Later Klavs Nordsø joined, and recently Ole Theill.

On the 1987 album Acoustic Guitars the famous NHØP appears as a guest star.

Members 
Mikkel Nordsø: Guitar
Christian Ratzer: Guitar
Steen Kyed: Guitar
Klavs Nordsø: Percussion
Ole Theill: Tablas

Discography 
On Sundance Records:
 Acoustic Guitars (1987)
 Gajos in disguise (1990)
 Out of the Blue (1995)
 Arabesque (2002)

On Columbia Records:
 Pa-Papegøje! (1994) ('I østen stiger solen op' with Nanna)
 Tangokat (1995) ('Bim bam busse' with Nanna)
 Hej Frede! (1996) ('Dyrene i Afrika' with Nanna)

External links 
 
  - Press release from Sundance record company
  - Press release from Sundance record company
 [] - Band page on Allmusic

Danish musical groups